The 1996 Holy Cross Crusaders football team was an American football team that represented the College of the Holy Cross during the 1996 NCAA Division I-AA football season. Holy Cross finished last in the Patriot League. 

In their first year under head coach Dan Allen, the Crusaders compiled a 2–9 record. David Streeter and Mike Zimirowski were the team captains.

The Crusaders were outscored 351 to 209. Their 1–5 conference record was the worst in the six-team Patriot League standings. 

Holy Cross played its home games at Fitton Field on the college campus in Worcester, Massachusetts.

Schedule

References

Holy Cross
Holy Cross Crusaders football seasons
Holy Cross Crusaders football